Anolis ernestwilliamsi, also known commonly as the Carrot Rock anole, Carrot Rock's anole,  and Ernest's anole, is a species of lizard in the family Dactyloidae. The species is endemic to the British Virgin Islands.

Etymology
The specific name, ernestwilliamsi, is in honor of American herpetologist Ernest Edward Williams.

Geographic range
A. ernestwilliamsi is known only from Carrot Rock, which is an islet south of Peter Island, in the British Virgin Islands.

Habitat

Behavior
A. ernestwilliamsi is terrestrial and saxicolous (rock dwelling).

Reproduction
A. ernestwilliamsi is oviparous.

Taxonomy
A. ernestwilliamsi is a member of the Anolis cristatellus species group.

References

Further reading
Brandley MC, de Queiroz K (2004). "Phylogeny, ecomorphological evolution, and historical biogeography of the Anolis cristatellus series". Herpetological Monographs 18 (1): 90–126.
Lazell JD Jr (1983). "Biogeography of the Herpetofauna of the British Virgin Islands, with Description of a New Anole (Sauria: Iguanidae)". pp. 99–117. In: Rhodin AGJ, Miyata K (editors) (1983). Advances in Herpetology and Evolutionary Biology: Essays in Honor of Ernest E. Williams. Cambridge, Massachusetts: Museum of Comparative Zoology. xix + 725 pp. . (Anolis ernestwilliamsi, new species, pp. 102–103, Figure 2, 106–107, Figure 3).
Nicholson KE, Crother BI, Guyer C, Savage JM (2012). "It is time for a new classification of anoles (Squamata: Dactyloidae)". Zootaxa 3477: 1–108. (Ctenonotus ernestwilliamsi, new combination, p. 88).
Schwartz A, Henderson RW (1991). Amphibians and Reptiles of the West Indies: Descriptions, Distributions, and Natural History. Gainesville: University of Florida Press. 720 pp. . (Anolis ernestwilliamsi, p. 258).

Anoles
Reptiles described in 1983
Endemic fauna of the British Virgin Islands